Aalia Furniturewala (born 28 November 1997), known by her stage name Alaya F, is an Indian actress who appears in Hindi films. Born into the Bedi family, she is the daughter of actress Pooja Bedi. She made her acting debut in 2020 with the comedy film Jawaani Jaaneman, for which she won the Filmfare Award for Best Female Debut. She has since starred in the thriller Freddy (2022).

Early life and background 
Alaya F was born Aalia Furniturewala on 28 November 1997, in Mumbai, Maharashtra, India to actress Pooja Bedi and businessman Farhan Ebrahim Furniturewala. She is of Parsi and Gujarati Khoja Muslim descent on her father's side and Punjabi, Haryanvi, British and Bengali descent on her mother's side. She is the granddaughter of actor Kabir Bedi and classical dancer Protima Bedi.

She studied at Jamnabai Narsee School in Mumbai. Before making her film debut, she earned a diploma in acting at the New York Film Academy and later changed her name to Alaya F. She is presently training to be a  contemporary and kathak dancer.

Career 
Alaya made her film debut with Nitin Kakkar's Jawaani Jaaneman (2020), a family comedy-drama, in which she played a 21-year-old girl claiming a 40-year-old person who has a hatred for marriages, to be her father. The film received mixed reviews from critics. Bollywood Hungama noted, "Alaya makes an excellent debut and puts up a confident act. She looks gorgeous and is the only actor who moves viewers to an extent." While India Today mentioned "Alaya will steal your heart. She is just a natural in front of the camera." She won the Filmfare Award for Best Female Debut for her performance.

Alaya next played Kainaaz Irani, a women in an abusive marriage in the 2022 film Freddy opposite Kartik Aaryan. News18 noted, "Alaya's performance is worth appreciating. She has done her part with utmost ease and grace." Filmfare said Alaya has managed to be both "vulnerable" and "cunning".

She then appeared in the 2023 film Almost Pyaar with DJ Mohabbat, opposite Karan Mehta. India Today stated, "Alaya has proved once again she is growing as an actor and makes a case for herself. She has portrayed both her characters with ease, perfection and brings out the innocence in her so well."

Media image 
Alaya is a celebrity endorser for several brands and products including Lenskart and Nykaa. She became the face of Nykaa's "A Million Nakhras" campaign in 2022. Alaya was ranked 42nd in Times' 50 Most Desirable Women List of 2020. In 2023, Alaya was placed in Eastern Eyes "30 under 30 Asians" list.

Filmography

Films

Music videos

Awards and nominations

References

External links 

 
 

1997 births
Living people
Indian film actresses
Actresses in Hindi cinema
Actresses of European descent in Indian films
Indian Ismailis
Khoja Ismailism
21st-century Indian actresses
Bengali people
Gujarati people
Parsi people
Punjabi people
Indian people of English descent
Filmfare Awards winners
Gujarati Muslims